Betsey Stockton (c. 1798–1865), sometimes spelled Betsy Stockton, was an American educator and missionary in Hawaii.

Life
Betsey was born into slavery in Princeton, New Jersey, about the year 1798. While she was a child, her owner Robert Stockton gave her to his daughter upon her marriage to Reverend Ashbel Green, president of the College of New Jersey (now Princeton University). Much of what is known of her earlier life comes from sporadic mentions of her in Green's diary; while useful, this source also reflects Green's assumption of control over the enslaved girl, often leaving out key details about her. When Green decided she needed further discipline, young Betsey was temporarily sent to labor in the household of Green's nephew, the Reverend Nathaniel Todd. The Todd household seemed a place Betsey was more able to flourish, but financial matters related to Todd's employment caused Betsey to return to Green's household in 1816. In 1817 she was admitted as a member of the First Presbyterian Church in Princeton; it is likely she was formally manumitted (freed) at that time. It appears she chose the surname of Stockton for herself, likely reflecting her own former enslavement by the white Stockton family, and perhaps also indicating her father or another paternal relative was a white Stockton. She remained as a paid domestic servant with the family, and learned to read, perhaps with some instruction from Reverend Green's sons. She gained her education from reading in Reverend Green's library, and eventually gained fluency to read religious and scholarly texts in several languages. A deeply religious person, she expressed a desire to go as a missionary to Africa.

Betsey Stockton learned of plans by Charles S. Stewart, a student at Princeton Theological Seminary and friend of the Green family, to go to Hawaii (then known as the Sandwich Islands) as a missionary. She expressed a desire to go with him and his family. Dr. Green and her Sabbath school teacher wrote letters of recommendation to the American Board of Commissioners for Foreign Missions. Stockton was commissioned by the Board as a missionary, and became the second single American woman (after Charlotte White) sent overseas as a missionary. Her contract with the Board and with the Stewarts said that she went "neither as an equal nor as a servant, but as a humble Christian friend" to the Stewarts, and provided that she was not to be more occupied with domestic duties than the other missionaries!

The team set sail from New Haven, Connecticut on November 22, 1822 for a five-month voyage. The Stewarts and Stockton settled at Lāhainā on Maui. Stockton was the first unmarried woman from the U.S. to travel to Hawai'i as a missionary (most women accompanied their husbands), as well as the first African American to serve as a missionary in Hawai'i. She was the teacher of the first mission school opened to the common (non-chiefly) people of Hawaii. Along with being a missionary and teacher, Betsey also served unofficially as a doctor and nurse to a number of people in Hawaii. She also trained native Hawaiian teachers, who took over from her upon her departure until the arrival of another missionary. She returned with the Stewarts to the U.S. in 1825 due to Mrs. Stewart's poor health. A version of Stockton's Hawaiian diary was published in the Christian Advocate by Dr. Green in 1824 and 1825.

Stockton stayed with the Stewart household until at least 1830. She taught briefly at an infant school in Philadelphia, Pennsylvania, and established a school for Indians at Grape Island, Canada. After returning to Princeton in 1835, she taught in its school for people of color until her death on October 24, 1865. In 1840, she helped found Princeton's First Presbyterian Church of Color, which in 1848 was renamed the Witherspoon Street Church. She was buried in Cooperstown, New York alongside the Stewart family.

References

 

 
 
 
 
 

1798 births
1865 deaths
People from Princeton, New Jersey
American Presbyterian missionaries
Female Christian missionaries
African-American educators
African-American missionaries
American expatriates in the Hawaiian Kingdom
Presbyterian missionaries in Hawaii
Educators from New Jersey
19th-century American women educators
19th-century American educators